Communist Party USA, officially the Communist Party of the United States of America (CPUSA), also known as the American Communist Party, is a Marxist–Leninist communist party in the United States which was established in 1919 after a split in the Socialist Party of America following the Russian Revolution.

The history of the CPUSA is closely related to the history of the American labor movement and the history of communist parties worldwide. Initially operating underground due to the Palmer Raids which started during the First Red Scare, the party was influential in American politics in the first half of the 20th century, and it also played a prominent role in the history of the labor movement from the 1920s through the 1940s, becoming known for opposing racism and racial segregation after sponsoring the defense for the Scottsboro Boys in 1931. Its membership increased during the Great Depression, and it also played a key role in the founding of the Congress of Industrial Organizations. The CPUSA subsequently declined due to events such as World War II, the beginning of the Cold War, the second Red Scare, and the influence of McCarthyism. Its opposition to the Marshall Plan and the Truman Doctrine was unpopular, with its endorsed candidate Henry A. Wallace under-performing in the 1948 presidential election. Its support for the Soviet Union increasingly alienated it from the rest of the left in the United States in the 1960s.

The CPUSA received significant funding from the Soviet Union and crafted its public positions to match those of Moscow. The CPUSA also used a covert apparatus to assist the Soviets with their intelligence activities in the United States and utilized a network of front organizations to shape public opinion. The CPUSA opposed glasnost and perestroika in the Soviet Union and as a result major funding from the Communist Party of the Soviet Union ended in 1989.

History 

During the first half of the 20th century, the Communist Party was influential in various struggles for democratic rights. It played a prominent role in the labor movement from the 1920s through the 1940s, having a major hand in founding most of the country's first industrial unions (which would later use the McCarran Internal Security Act to expel their communist members) and it also became known for opposing racism and fighting for integration in workplaces and communities during the height of the Jim Crow period of racial segregation. Historian Ellen Schrecker concludes that decades of recent scholarship offer "a more nuanced portrayal of the party as both a Stalinist sect tied to a vicious regime and the most dynamic organization within the American Left during the 1930s and '40s". It was also the first political party in the United States to be racially integrated.

By August 1919, only months after its founding, the Communist Party claimed to have 50,000 to 60,000 members. Its members also included anarchists and other radical leftists. At the time, the older and more moderate Socialist Party of America, suffering from criminal prosecutions for its antiwar stance during World War I, had declined to 40,000 members. The sections of the Communist Party's International Workers Order (IWO) organized for communism around linguistic and ethnic lines, providing mutual aid and tailoring cultural activities to an IWO membership that peaked at 200,000 at its height. Subsequent splits within the party have weakened its position.

During the Great Depression, many Americans became disillusioned with capitalism and some of them found communist ideology appealing. Others were attracted by the visible activism of Communists on behalf of a wide range of social and economic causes, including the rights of African Americans, workers and the unemployed. The Communist Party played a significant role in the resurgence of organized labor in the 1930s. Still others, alarmed by the rise of the Falangists in Spain and the Nazis in Germany, admired the Soviet Union's early and staunch opposition to fascism. Party membership swelled from 7,500 at the start of the decade to 55,000 by its end.

Party members also rallied to the defense of the Spanish Republic during this period after a nationalist military uprising moved to overthrow it, resulting in the Spanish Civil War (1936–1939). The Communist Party of the Soviet Union, along with leftists throughout the world, raised funds for medical relief while many of its members made their way to Spain with the aid of the party to join the Lincoln Brigade, one of the International Brigades.

The Communist Party was adamantly opposed to fascism during the Popular Front period. Although membership in the party rose to about 66,000 by 1939, nearly 20,000 members left the party by 1943, after the Soviet Union signed the Molotov–Ribbentrop Pact with Nazi Germany on August 23, 1939. While general secretary Browder at first attacked Germany for its September 1, 1939 invasion of western Poland, on September 11 the Communist Party received a blunt directive from Moscow denouncing the Polish government. Between September 14–16, party leaders bickered about the direction to take.

On September 17, the Soviet Union invaded eastern Poland and occupied the Polish territory assigned to it by the Molotov–Ribbentrop Pact, followed by co-ordination with German forces in Poland.

The British, French and German Communist parties, all originally war supporters, abandoned their anti-fascist crusades, demanded peace and denounced Allied governments. The Communist Party turned the focus of its public activities from anti-fascism to advocating peace, not only opposing military preparations, but also condemning those opposed to Hitler. The party attacked British Prime Minister Neville Chamberlain and French leader Édouard Daladier, but it did not at first attack President Roosevelt, reasoning that this could devastate American Communism, blaming instead Roosevelt's advisors.

In October and November, after the Soviets invaded Finland and forced mutual assistance pacts from Estonia, Latvia and Lithuania, the Communist Party considered Russian security sufficient justification to support the actions. Secret short wave radio broadcasts in October from Comintern leader Georgi Dimitrov ordered Browder to change the party's support for Roosevelt. On October 23, the party began attacking Roosevelt. The party was active in the isolationist America First Committee.

The Communist Party dropped its boycott of Nazi goods, spread the slogans "The Yanks Are Not Coming" and "Hands Off", set up a "perpetual peace vigil" across the street from the White House and announced that Roosevelt was the head of the "war party of the American bourgeoisie". By April 1940, the party Daily Worker'''s line seemed not so much antiwar as simply pro-German. A pamphlet stated the Jews had just as much to fear from Britain and France as they did Germany. In August 1940, after NKVD agent Ramón Mercader killed Trotsky with an ice axe, Browder perpetuated Moscow's fiction that the killer, who had been dating one of Trotsky's secretaries, was a disillusioned follower. In allegiance to the Soviet Union, the party changed this policy again after Hitler broke the Molotov–Ribbentrop Pact by attacking the Soviet Union on June 22, 1941.

The Communist Party's early labor and organizing successes did not last long. As the decades progressed, the combined effects of the second Red Scare, McCarthyism, Nikita Khrushchev's 1956 "Secret Speech" in which he denounced the previous decades of Joseph Stalin's rule and the adversities of the continuing Cold War mentality, steadily weakened the party's internal structure and confidence. Party membership in the Communist International and its close adherence to the political positions of the Soviet Union gave most Americans the impression that the party was not only a threatening, subversive domestic entity, it was also a foreign agent which espoused an ideology which was fundamentally alien and threatening to the American way of life. Internal and external crises swirled together, to the point when members who did not end up in prison for party activities either tended to disappear quietly from its ranks or they tended to adopt more moderate political positions which were at odds with the party line. By 1957, membership had dwindled to less than 10,000, of whom some 1,500 were informants for the FBI. The party was also banned by the Communist Control Act of 1954, which still remains in effect although it was never really enforced.

The party attempted to recover with its opposition to the Vietnam War during the civil rights movement in the 1960s, but its continued uncritical support for an increasingly stultified and militaristic Soviet Union further alienated it from the rest of the left-wing in the United States, which saw this supportive role as outdated and even dangerous. At the same time, the party's aging membership demographics and calls for "peaceful coexistence" failed to inspire the New Left in the United States.

With the rise of Mikhail Gorbachev and his effort to radically alter the Soviet economic and political system from the mid-1980s, the Communist Party finally became estranged from the leadership of the Soviet Union itself. In 1989, the Soviet Communist Party cut off major funding to the American Communist Party due to its opposition to glasnost and perestroika. With the dissolution of the Soviet Union in 1991, the party held its convention and attempted to resolve the issue of whether the party should reject Marxism–Leninism. The majority reasserted the party's now purely Marxist outlook, prompting a minority faction which urged social democrats to exit the now reduced party. The party has since adopted Marxism–Leninism within its program. In 2014, the new draft of the party constitution declared: "We apply the scientific outlook developed by Marx, Engels, Lenin and others in the context of our American history, culture, and traditions".

The Communist Party is based in New York City. From 1922 to 1988, it published Morgen Freiheit, a daily newspaper written in Yiddish.Henry Felix Srebrnik, Dreams of Nationhood: American Jewish Communists and the Soviet Birobidzhan Project, 1924–1951. Brighton, MA: Academic Studies Press, 2010; p. 2. For decades, its West Coast newspaper was the People's World and its East Coast newspaper was The Daily World. The two newspapers merged in 1986 into the People's Weekly World. The People's Weekly World has since become an online only publication called People's World. It has since ceased being an official Communist Party publication as the party does not fund its publication. The party's former theoretical journal Political Affairs is now also published exclusively online, but the party still maintains International Publishers as its publishing house. In June 2014, the party held its 30th National Convention in Chicago.

The party announced on April 7, 2021, that it intended to run candidates in elections again, after a hiatus of over thirty years. Steven Estrada, who is running for city council in Long Beach, is one of the first candidates to run as an open member of the CPUSA  again (although Long Beach local elections are non-partisan).

 Beliefs 
 Constitution program 
According to the constitution of the party adopted at the 30th National Convention in 2014, the Communist Party operates on the principle of democratic centralism, its highest authority being the quadrennial National Convention. Article VI, Section 3 of the 2001 Constitution laid out certain positions as non-negotiable:

[S]truggle for the unity of the working class, against all forms of national oppression, national chauvinism, discrimination and segregation, against all racist ideologies and practices,... against all manifestations of male supremacy and discrimination against women,... against homophobia and all manifestations of discrimination against gays, lesbians, bisexuals, and transgender people.

Among the points in the party's "Immediate Program" are a $15/hour minimum wage for all workers, national universal health care and opposition to privatization of Social Security. Economic measures such as increased taxes on "the rich and corporations", "strong regulation" of the financial industry, "regulation and public ownership of utilities" and increased federal aid to cities and states; opposition to the Iraq War and other military interventions; opposition to free trade treaties such as the North American Free Trade Agreement (NAFTA); nuclear disarmament and a reduced military budget; various civil rights provisions; campaign finance reform including public financing of campaigns; and election law reform, including instant runoff voting.

 Bill of Rights socialism 

The Communist Party emphasizes a vision of socialism as an extension of American democracy. Seeking to "build socialism in the United States based on the revolutionary traditions and struggles" of American history, the party promotes a conception of "Bill of Rights Socialism" that will "guarantee all the freedoms we have won over centuries of struggle and also extend the Bill of Rights to include freedom from unemployment" as well as freedom "from poverty, from illiteracy, and from discrimination and oppression".

Reiterating the idea of property rights in socialist society as it is outlined in Karl Marx and Friedrich Engels's Communist Manifesto (1848), the Communist Party emphasizes:

Many myths have been propagated about socialism. Contrary to right-wing claims, socialism would not take away the personal private property of workers, only the private ownership of major industries, financial institutions, and other large corporations, and the excessive luxuries of the super-rich.

Rather than making all wages entirely equal, the Communist Party holds that building socialism would entail "eliminating private wealth from stock speculation, from private ownership of large corporations, from the export of capital and jobs, and from the exploitation of large numbers of workers".

 Living standards 
Among the primary concerns of the Communist Party are the problems of unemployment, underemployment and job insecurity, which the party considers the natural result of the profit-driven incentives of the capitalist economy:

Millions of workers are unemployed, underemployed, or insecure in their jobs, even during economic upswings and periods of 'recovery' from recessions. Most workers experience long years of stagnant and declining real wages, while health and education costs soar. Many workers are forced to work second and third jobs to make ends meet. Most workers now average four different occupations during their lifetime, many involuntarily moved from job to job and career to career. Often, retirement-age workers are forced to continue working just to provide health care for themselves and their families. Millions of people continuously live below the poverty level; many suffer homelessness and hunger. Public and private programs to alleviate poverty and hunger do not reach everyone, and are inadequate even for those they do reach. With capitalist globalization, jobs move from place to place as capitalists export factories and even entire industries to other countries in a relentless search for the lowest wages.

The Communist Party believes that "class struggle starts with the fight for wages, hours, benefits, working conditions, job security, and jobs. But it also includes an endless variety of other forms for fighting specific battles: resisting speed-up, picketing, contract negotiations, strikes, demonstrations, lobbying for pro-labor legislation, elections, and even general strikes". The Communist Party's national programs considers workers who struggle "against the capitalist class or any part of it on any issue with the aim of improving or defending their lives" part of the class struggle.

 Imperialism and war 
The Communist Party maintains that developments within the foreign policy of the United States—as reflected in the rise of neoconservatives and other groups associated with right-wing politics—have developed in tandem with the interests of large-scale capital such as the multinational corporations. The state thereby becomes thrust into a proxy role that is essentially inclined to help facilitate "control by one section of the capitalist class over all others and over the whole of society".

Accordingly, the Communist Party holds that right-wing policymakers such as the neoconservatives, steering the state away from working-class interests on behalf of a disproportionately powerful capitalist class, have "demonized foreign opponents of the U.S., covertly funded the right-wing-initiated civil war in Nicaragua, and gave weapons to the Saddam Hussein dictatorship in Iraq. They picked small countries to invade, including Panama and Grenada, testing new military equipment and strategy, and breaking down resistance at home and abroad to U.S. military invasion as a policy option".

From its ideological framework, the Communist Party understands imperialism as the pinnacle of capitalist development: the state, working on behalf of the few who wield disproportionate power, assumes the role of proffering "phony rationalizations" for economically driven imperial ambition as a means to promote the sectional economic interests of big business.

In opposition to what it considers the ultimate agenda of the conservative wing of American politics, the Communist Party rejects foreign policy proposals such as the Bush Doctrine, rejecting the right of the American government to attack "any country it wants, to conduct war without end until it succeeds everywhere, and even to use 'tactical' nuclear weapons and militarize space. Whoever does not support the U.S. policy is condemned as an opponent. Whenever international organizations, such as the United Nations, do not support U.S. government policies, they are reluctantly tolerated until the U.S. government is able to subordinate or ignore them".

Juxtaposing the support from the Republicans and the right-wing of the Democratic Party for the Bush administration-led invasion of Iraq with the many millions of Americans who opposed the invasion of Iraq from its beginning, the Communist Party notes the spirit of opposition towards the war coming from the American public:

The party has consistently opposed American involvement in the Korean War, the Vietnam War, the First Gulf War and the post-September 11 conflicts in both Iraq and Afghanistan.

The Communist Party does not believe that the threat of terrorism can be resolved through war.

 Women and minorities 

The Communist Party Constitution defines the U.S. working class as "multiracial and multinational. It unites men and women, young and old, gay and straight, native-born and immigrant, urban and rural." The party further expands its interpretation to include the employed and unemployed, organized and unorganized, and of all occupations.

The Communist Party seeks equal rights for women, equal pay for equal work and the protection of reproductive rights, together with putting an end to sexism. They support the right of abortion and social services to provide access to it, arguing that unplanned pregnancy is prejudiced against poor women. The party's ranks include a Women's Equality Commission, which recognizes the role of women as an asset in moving towards building socialism.

Historically significant in American history as an early fighter for African Americans' rights and playing a leading role in protesting the lynchings of African Americans in the South, the Communist Party in its national program today calls racism the "classic divide-and-conquer tactic".Section 3d: "The Working Class, Class Struggle, Democratic Struggle, and Forces for Progress: The Working Class and Trade Union Movement Democratic Struggle and its Relation to Class Struggle Special Oppression and Exploitation. Multiracial, Multinational Unity for Full Equality and Against Racism". CPUSA Online. May 19, 2006. Retrieved April 7, 2009. From its New York City base, the Communist Party's Ben Davis Club and other Communist Party organizations have been involved in local activism in Harlem and other African American and minority communities. The Communist Party was instrumental in the founding of the progressive Black Radical Congress in 1998, as well as the African Blood Brotherhood.

Historically significant in Latino working class history as a successful organizer of the Mexican American working class in the Southwestern United States in the 1930s, the Communist Party regards working-class Latino people as another oppressed group targeted by overt racism as well as systemic discrimination in areas such as education and sees the participation of Latino voters in a general mass movement in both party-based and nonpartisan work as an essential goal for major left-wing progress.

The Communist Party holds that racial and ethnic discrimination not only harms minorities, but is pernicious to working-class people of all backgrounds as any discriminatory practices between demographic sections of the working class constitute an inherently divisive practice responsible for "obstructing the development of working-class consciousness, driving wedges in class unity to divert attention from class exploitation, and creating extra profits for the capitalist class".See also Executive Vice Chair Jarvis Tyner's ideological essay "The National Question". CPUSA Online. August 1, 2003. Retrieved April 7, 2009.

The Communist Party supports an end to racial profiling. The party supports continued enforcement of civil rights laws as well as affirmative action.

 Environment 
The Communist Party notes its commitment to participating in environmental movements wherever possible, emphasizing the significance of building unity between the environmental movement and other progressive tendencies.

The Communist Party's most recently released environmental document—the CPUSA National Committee's "2008 Global Warming Report"—takes note of the necessity of "major changes in how [society] lives, moves, produces, grows, and markets". These changes, the party believe, cannot be effectively accomplished solely on the basis of profit considerations:

Supporting cooperation between economically advanced and less economically developed nations in the area of environmental cooperation, the Communist Party stands in favor of promoting "transfer from developed countries to developing countries of sustainable technology, and funds for capital investment in sustainable agriculture, energy, and industry." The party is additionally a strong proponent of preserving rainforests and openly encourages other countries' governments to do the same.

The Communist Party opposes drilling in the Alaska National Wildlife Refuge, the use of nuclear power until and unless there is a safe way to dispose of its waste and it conceives of nuclear war as the greatest possible environmental threat.

 Religion 
The Communist Party is not against religion, but instead regards positively religious people's belief in justice, peace and respectful relations among peoples. To build good relations with supporters of religion, the party has its own Religious Commission.

 Geography 

The Communist Party garnered support in particular communities, developing a unique geography. Instead of a broad nationwide support, support for the party was concentrated in different communities at different times, depending on the organizing strategy at that moment.

Before World War II, the Communist Party had relatively stable support in New York City, Chicago and St. Louis County, Minnesota. However, at times the party also had strongholds in more rural counties such as Sheridan County, Montana (22% in 1932), Iron County, Wisconsin (4% in 1932), or Ontonagon County, Michigan (5% in 1934). Even in the South at the height of Jim Crow, the Communist Party had a significant presence in Alabama. Despite the disenfranchisement of African Americans, the party gained 8% of the votes in rural Elmore County. This was mostly due to the successful biracial organizing of sharecroppers through the Sharecroppers' Union.

Unlike open mass organizations like the Socialist Party or the NAACP, the Communist Party was a disciplined organization that demanded strenuous commitments and frequently expelled members. Membership levels remained below 20,000 until 1933 and then surged upward in the late 1930s, reaching 66,000 in 1939 and reaching its peak membership of over 75,000 in 1947.

The party fielded candidates in presidential and many state and local elections not expecting to win, but expecting loyalists to vote the party ticket. The party mounted symbolic yet energetic campaigns during each presidential election from 1924 through 1940 and many gubernatorial and congressional races from 1922 to 1944.

The Communist Party organized the country into districts that did not coincide with state lines, initially dividing it into 15 districts identified with a headquarters city with an additional "Agricultural District". Several reorganizations in the 1930s expanded the number of districts.

 Relations with other groups 
 United States labor movement 

The Communist Party has sought to play an active role in the labor movement since its origins as part of its effort to build a mass movement of American workers to bring about their own liberation through socialist revolution.

 Soviet funding and espionage 
From 1959 until 1989, when Gus Hall condemned the initiatives taken by Mikhail Gorbachev in the Soviet Union, the Communist Party received a substantial subsidy from the Soviets. There is at least one receipt signed by Gus Hall in the KGB archives. Starting with $75,000 in 1959, this was increased gradually to $3 million in 1987. This substantial amount reflected the party's loyalty to the Moscow line, in contrast to the Italian and later Spanish and British Communist parties, whose Eurocommunism deviated from the orthodox line in the late 1970s. Releases from the Soviet archives show that all national Communist parties that conformed to the Soviet line were funded in the same fashion. From the Communist point of view, this international funding arose from the internationalist nature of communism itself as fraternal assistance was considered the duty of communists in any one country to give aid to their allies in other countries. From the anti-Communist point of view, this funding represented an unwarranted interference by one country in the affairs of another. The cutoff of funds in 1989 resulted in a financial crisis, which forced the party to cut back publication in 1990 of the party newspaper, the People's Daily World, to weekly publication, the People's Weekly World (see references below).

Somewhat more controversial than mere funding is the alleged involvement of Communist members in espionage for the Soviet Union. Whittaker Chambers alleged that Sandor Goldberger—also known as Josef Peters, who commonly wrote under the name J. Peters—headed the Communist Party's underground secret apparatus from 1932 to 1938 and pioneered its role as an auxiliary to Soviet intelligence activities. Bernard Schuster, Organizational Secretary of the New York District of the Communist Party, is claimed to have been the operational recruiter and conduit for members of the party into the ranks of the secret apparatus, or "Group A line".

Stalin publicly disbanded the Comintern in 1943. A Moscow NKVD message to all stations on September 12, 1943, detailed instructions for handling intelligence sources within the Communist Party after the disestablishment of the Comintern.

There are a number of decrypted World War II Soviet messages between NKVD offices in the United States and Moscow, also known as the Venona cables. The Venona cables and other published sources appear to confirm that Julius Rosenberg was responsible for espionage. Theodore Hall, a Harvard-trained physicist who did not join the party until 1952, began passing information on the atomic bomb to the Soviets soon after he was hired at Los Alamos at age 19. Hall, who was known as Mlad by his KGB handlers, escaped prosecution. Hall's wife, aware of his espionage, claims that their NKVD handler had advised them to plead innocent, as the Rosenbergs did, if formally charged.

It was the belief of opponents of the Communist Party such as J. Edgar Hoover, longtime director of the FBI; and Joseph McCarthy, for whom McCarthyism is named; and other anti-Communists that the Communist Party constituted an active conspiracy, was secretive, loyal to a foreign power and whose members assisted Soviet intelligence in the clandestine infiltration of American government. This is the traditionalist view of some in the field of Communist studies such as Harvey Klehr and John Earl Haynes, since supported by several memoirs of ex Soviet KGB officers and information obtained from the Venona project and Soviet archives.Schecter, Jerrold and Leona, Sacred Secrets: How Soviet Intelligence Operations Changed American History, Potomac Books (2002).

At one time, this view was shared by the majority of the Congress. In the "Findings and declarations of fact" section of the Subversive Activities Control Act of 1950 (50 U.S.C. Chap. 23 Sub. IV Sec. 841), it stated:

[T]he Communist Party, although purportedly a political party, is in fact an instrumentality of a conspiracy to overthrow the Government of the United States. It constitutes an authoritarian dictatorship within a republic... the policies and programs of the Communist Party are secretly prescribed for it by the foreign leaders... to carry into action slavishly the assignments given.... [T]he Communist Party acknowledges no constitutional or statutory limitations.... The peril inherent in its operation arises [from] its dedication to the proposition that the present constitutional Government of the United States ultimately must be brought to ruin by any available means, including resort to force and violence... its role as the agency of a hostile foreign power renders its existence a clear present and continuing danger.

In 1993, experts from the Library of Congress traveled to Moscow to copy previously secret archives of the party records, sent to the Soviet Union for safekeeping by party organizers. The records provided an irrefutable link between Soviet intelligence and information obtained by the Communist Party and its contacts in the United States government from the 1920s through the 1940s. Some documents revealed that the Communist Party was actively involved in secretly recruiting party members from African American groups and rural farm workers. Other party records contained further evidence that Soviet sympathizers had indeed infiltrated the State Department, beginning in the 1930s. Included in Communist Party archival records were confidential letters from two American ambassadors in Europe to Roosevelt and a senior State Department official. Thanks to an official in the Department of State sympathetic to the party, the confidential correspondence, concerning political and economic matters in Europe, ended up in the hands of Soviet intelligence.Retrieved Papers Shed Light On Communist Activities In U.S., Associated Press, January 31, 2001.

 Counterintelligence 
In 1952, Jack and Morris Childs, together codenamed SOLO, became FBI informants. As high-ranking officials in the American Communist Party, they informed on the CPUSA for the rest of the Cold War, monitoring the Soviet funding. They also traveled to Moscow and Beijing to meet USSR and PRC leadership. Jack and Morris Childs both received the Presidential Medal of Freedom in 1987 for their intelligence work. Morris's son stated, "The CIA could not believe the information the FBI had because the American Communist Party had links directly into the Kremlin."

According to intelligence analyst Darren E. Tromblay, the SOLO operation, and the Ad Hoc Committee, were part of "developing geopolitical awareness" by the FBI about factors such as the Sino-Soviet split. The Ad Hoc Committee was a group within CPUSA that circulated a pro-Maoist bulletin in the voice of a "dedicated but rebellious comrade." Allegedly an operation, it caused a schism within the CPUSA.

 Criminal prosecutions 
When the Communist Party was formed in 1919, the United States government was engaged in prosecution of socialists who had opposed World War I and military service. This prosecution was continued in 1919 and January 1920 in the Palmer Raids as part of the First Red Scare. Rank and file foreign-born members of the Communist Party were targeted and as many as possible were arrested and deported while leaders were prosecuted and in some cases sentenced to prison terms. In the late 1930s, with the authorization of President Franklin D. Roosevelt, the FBI began investigating both domestic Nazis and Communists. In 1940, Congress passed the Smith Act, which made it illegal to advocate, abet, or teach the desirability of overthrowing the government.

In 1949, the federal government put Eugene Dennis, William Z. Foster and ten other Communist Party leaders on trial for advocating the violent overthrow of the government. Because the prosecution could not show that any of the defendants had openly called for violence or been involved in accumulating weapons for a proposed revolution, it relied on the testimony of former members of the party that the defendants had privately advocated the overthrow of the government and on quotations from the work of Marx, Lenin and other revolutionary figures of the past. During the course of the trial, the judge held several of the defendants and all of their counsel in contempt of court. All of the remaining eleven defendants were found guilty, and the Supreme Court upheld the constitutionality of their convictions by a 6–2 vote in Dennis v. United States, . The government then proceeded with the prosecutions of more than 140 members of the party.

Panicked by these arrests and fearing that the party was dangerously compromised by informants, Dennis and other party leaders decided to go underground and to disband many affiliated groups. The move heightened the political isolation of the leadership while making it nearly impossible for the party to function. The widespread support of action against communists and their associates began to abate after Senator Joseph McCarthy overreached himself in the Army–McCarthy hearings, producing a backlash. The end of the Korean War in 1953 also led to a lessening of anxieties about subversion. The Supreme Court brought a halt to the Smith Act prosecutions in 1957 in its decision in Yates v. United States, which required that the government prove that the defendant had actually taken concrete steps toward the forcible overthrow of the government, rather than merely advocating it in theory.

 African Americans 

The Communist Party played a significant role in defending the rights of African Americans during its heyday in the 1930s and 1940s. The Alabama Chapter of the Communist Party USA played a highly important role in organizing the unemployed Black workers, the Alabama Sharecroppers' Union and numerous anti-lynching campaigns. Further, the Alabama chapter organized many young activists that would later go on to be prominent members in the civil rights movement, such as Rosa Parks. Throughout its history many of the party's leaders and political thinkers have been African Americans. James Ford, Charlene Mitchell, Angela Davis and Jarvis Tyner, the current executive vice chair of the party, all ran as presidential or vice presidential candidates on the party ticket. Others like Benjamin J. Davis, William L. Patterson, Harry Haywood, James Jackson, Henry Winston, Claude Lightfoot, Alphaeus Hunton, Doxey Wilkerson, Claudia Jones and John Pittman contributed in important ways to the party's approaches to major issues from human and civil rights, peace, women's equality, the national question, working class unity, socialist thought, cultural struggle and more. African American thinkers, artists and writers such as Claude McKay, Richard Wright, Ann Petry, W. E. B. Du Bois, Shirley Graham Du Bois, Lloyd Brown, Charles White, Elizabeth Catlett, Paul Robeson, Gwendolyn Brooks and many more were one-time members or supporters of the party and the Communist Party also had a close alliance with Harlem Congressman Adam Clayton Powell Jr. The party's work to appeal to African Americans continues to this day. It was instrumental in the founding of the Black Radical Congress in 1998.

 Gay rights movement 
One of the most prominent sexual radicals in the United States, Harry Hay, developed his political views as an active member of the Communist Party. Hay founded in the early 1950s the Mattachine Society, America's second gay rights organization. However, gay rights was not seen as something the party should associate with organizationally. Most party members saw homosexuality as something done by those with fascist tendencies (following the lead of the Soviet Union in criminalizing the practice for that reason). Hay was expelled from the party as an ideological risk. In 2004, the editors of Political Affairs published articles detailing their self-criticism of the party's early views of gay and lesbian rights and praised Hay's work.

The Communist Party endorsed LGBT rights in a 2005 statement. The party affirmed the resolution with a statement a year later in honor of gay pride month in June 2006.

 United States peace movement 
The Communist Party opposed the United States involvement in the early stages of World War II (until June 22, 1941, the date of the German invasion of the Soviet Union), the Korean War, the Vietnam War, the invasion of Grenada and American support for anti-Communist military dictatorships and movements in Central America. Meanwhile, some in the peace movement and the New Left rejected the Communist Party for what it saw as the party's bureaucratic rigidity and for its close association with the Soviet Union.

The Communist Party was consistently opposed to the United States' 2003–2011 war in Iraq. United for Peace and Justice (UFPJ) includes the New York branch of the Communist Party as a member group, with Communist Judith LeBlanc serving as the co-chair of UFPJ from 2007 to 2009.

 Presidential tickets 

 Best results in major races 

 Party leaders 

 Notable CPUSA members 

 See also 
 English-language press of the Communist Party USA (annotated list of titles)
 Federal Bureau of Investigation
 History of Soviet espionage in the United States
 International Publishers
 Jencks v. United States Language federation
 National conventions of the Communist Party USA
 Non-English press of the Communist Party USA (annotated list of titles)
 Progressive Labor Party (United States)
 Revolutionary Communist Party, USA
 Socialist Workers Party (United States)
 W.E.B. Du Bois Clubs of America
 Young Communist League USA
 List of Communist Party USA members who have held office in the United States

 Notes 

 References 

 Further reading 

 Arnesen, Eric, "Civil Rights and the Cold War at Home: Postwar Activism, Anticommunism, and the Decline of the Left", American Communist History (2012), 11#1 pp 5–44.
 Draper, Theodore, The Roots of American Communism. New York: Viking, 1957.
 Draper, Theodore, American Communism and Soviet Russia: The Formative Period. New York: Viking, 1960.
 Draper, Theodore, The Roots of American Communism. New Brunswick, New Jersey: Transaction Publishers (Originally published by Viking Press in 1957). .
 Howe, Irving and Lewis Coser, The American Communist Party: A Critical History. Boston: Beacon Press, 1957.
 Isserman, Maurice, Which Side Were You On?: The American Communist Party During the Second World War. Wesleyan University Press, 1982 and 1987.
 Jaffe, Philip J., Rise and Fall of American Communism. Horizon Press, 1975.
 Klehr, Harvey. The Heyday of American Communism: The Depression Decade, Basic Books, 1984.
 Klehr, Harvey and Haynes, John Earl, The American Communist Movement: Storming Heaven Itself, Twayne Publishers (Macmillan), 1992.
 Klehr, Harvey, John Earl Haynes, and Fridrikh Igorevich Firsov. The Secret World of American Communism. New Haven: Yale University Press, 1995.
 Klehr, Harvey, Kyrill M. Anderson, and John Earl Haynes. The Soviet World of American Communism. New Haven: Yale University Press, 1998.
 Lewy, Guenter, The Cause That Failed: Communism in American Political Life. New York: Oxford University Press, 1997.
 McDuffie, Erik S., Sojourning for Freedom: Black Women, American Communism, and the Making of Black Left Feminism. Durham: Duke University Press, 2011
 Ottanelli, Fraser M., The Communist Party of the United States: From the Depression to World War II. New Brunswick, NJ: Rutgers University Press, 1991.
 Maurice Spector, James P. Cannon, and the Origins of Canadian Trotskyism, 1890–1928. Urbana, IL: Illinois University Press, 2007
 Palmer, Bryan, James P. Cannon and the Origins of the American Revolutionary Left, 1890–1928. Urbana, IL: Illinois University Press, 2007.
 Service, Robert. Comrades!: a history of world communism (2007).
 Shannon, David A., The Decline of American Communism: A History of the Communist Party of the United States since 1945. New York: Harcourt, Brace and Co., 1959.
 Starobin, Joseph R., American Communism in Crisis, 1943–1957. Cambridge, MA: Harvard University Press, 1972.
 Zumoff, Jacob A. The Communist International and US Communism, 1919–1929.'' [2014] Chicago: Haymarket Books, 2015.

Archives 
 "Communist Party of the United States of America Records", Tamiment Library and Robert F. Wagner Archives, New York University Special Collections
 Communist Party of the United States of America Records, 1956–1960. At the Labor Archives of Washington, University of Washington Libraries Special Collections.
 Communist Party of the United States of America, Washington State District Records, 1919–2003. At the Labor Archives of Washington, University of Washington Libraries Special Collections.
 Marion S. Kinney Papers, 1930–1983. At the Labor Archives of Washington, University of Washington Libraries Special Collections.

External links
 
 Young Communist League USA – youth group
 People's World – weekly newspaper
 Communism in Washington State History and Memory Project
 Manifesto and program. Constitution. Report to the Communist International – first pamphlet of the Communist Party of America
 Manifesto to the workers of America
 FBI files on the CPUSA on the Internet Archive

 
1919 establishments in the United States
Communism in the United States
Communist parties in the United States
Formerly banned communist parties
Political parties established in 1919
Political parties in the United States
Socialist parties in the United States
Soviet Union–United States relations
William Z. Foster
International Meeting of Communist and Workers Parties